Gielde is a village and a former municipality in the district of Wolfenbüttel, in Lower Saxony, Germany. Since 1 November 2013, it is part of the Schladen-Werla municipality.

Geography
Gielde is situated in the northern foothills of the Harz mountain range, located between Vienenburg (part of Goslar) in the south and Wolfenbüttel in the north; neighbouring villages are Schladen in the southeast and Liebenburg in the southwest.

History

A settlement at the site named Gelithi was first mentioned in a 953 deed and as Gelithe in 1140. A first parish church was probably erected during the incumbency of Bishop Gotthard of Hildesheim in the early 12th century. The area then was part of the medieval Duchy of Saxony. The remnants of a Saxon hillfort (Kukeriulenburg) are visible in the north of the present-day village, possibly used as a refuge castle related to the nearby Royal palace of Werla. 

The manor of Altenrode, which may have been built from stones of the decayed castle, was documented as an estate of the Heiningen monastery since 1306. When the abbey was secularised in 1810, the manor became a private property and today is a listed monument.

References

External links

Gielde on schladen-werla.de 

Wolfenbüttel (district)
Former municipalities in Lower Saxony
Populated places disestablished in 2013